Veinticinco de Mayo is a  department of Chaco Province in Argentina.

The provincial subdivision has a population of about 28,000 inhabitants in an area of  2,576 km², and its capital city is Machagai, which is located around 1,140 km from the Capital federal.

Settlements 
 Colonia Agricola Aborigen Chaco
 Colonia La Tambora
 Machagai
 Napalpi

References

Departments of Chaco Province